This is the discography for American jazz musician Grant Green.

As leader
Blue Note Records

Other labels

As sideman
1959
 Jimmy Forrest – All the Gin Is Gone  (Delmark)
 Jimmy Forrest – Black Forrest  (Delmark)

1960
 Sam Lazar – Space Flight  (Argo)
 Willie Dixon – Blues Roots Series, Vol. 12  (Chess)

1961
 Lou Donaldson – Here 'Tis  (Blue Note)
 Baby Face Willette – Face to Face  (Blue Note)
 Baby Face Willette – Stop and Listen  (Blue Note)
 Brother Jack McDuff – The Honeydripper  (Prestige)
 Stanley Turrentine – Up at "Minton's" (Blue Note)
 Dave Bailey – Reaching Out  (Jazztime)
 Hank Mobley – Workout (Blue Note)
 Horace Parlan – Up & Down  (Blue Note)
 Brother Jack McDuff – Steppin' Out  (Prestige)
 Brother Jack McDuff – Goodnight, It's Time to Go  (Prestige)
 Stanley Turrentine – ZT's Blues  (Blue Note)
 Lou Donaldson – A Man with a Horn  (Blue Note)
 Sonny Red – The Mode  (Jazzland)
 Sonny Red – Images (Jazzland)
 Ike Quebec – Blue & Sentimental (Blue Note)

1962
 Joe Carroll – Man with a Happy Sound  (Charlie Parker Records)
 Dodo Greene – My Hour of Need  (Blue Note)
 Don Wilkerson – Elder Don  (Blue Note)
 Don Wilkerson – Preach Brother!  (Blue Note)
 Lou Donaldson – The Natural Soul  (Blue Note)

1963
 Lou Donaldson – Good Gracious!  (Blue Note)
 Jimmy Smith – I'm Movin' On  (Blue Note)
 Jimmy Smith – Special Guests  (Blue Note [rel. 1984])
 Booker Ervin – Back from the Gig  (Blue Note)
 Herbie Hancock – My Point of View  (Blue Note)
 Horace Parlan – Happy Frame of Mind  (Blue Note)
 "Big" John Patton – Along Came John  (Blue Note)
 Gloria Coleman – Soul Sisters  (Impulse!)
 Harold Vick – Steppin' Out!  (Blue Note)
 "Big" John Patton – Blue John  (Blue Note)
 Don Wilkerson – Shoutin'  (Blue Note)
 George Braith – Two Souls in One  (Blue Note)
 Mary Lou Williams – Black Christ of the Andes  (Saba/MPS)
 George Braith – Soulstream  (Blue Note)
 Bobby Hutcherson – The Kicker  (Blue Note)

1964
 Lee Morgan – Search for the New Land  (Blue Note)
 George Braith – Extension (Blue Note)
 "Big" John Patton – The Way I Feel  (Blue Note)
 Larry Young – Into Somethin'  (Blue Note)
 Donald Byrd – I'm Tryin' to Get Home (Blue Note)

1965
 Johnny Hodges & Wild Bill Davis – Joe's Blues (Verve) 
 Johnny Hodges & Wild Bill Davis – Wings & Things (Verve)
 Grassella Oliphant – The Grass is Greener (Atlantic)
 "Big" John Patton – Oh Baby!  (Blue Note)
 Art Blakey – Hold On, I'm Coming (Limelight)
 Lou Donaldson – Musty Rusty  (Cadet)
 "Big" John Patton – Let 'em Roll  (Blue Note)

1966
 George Braith – Laughing Soul (Prestige)
 "Big" John Patton – Got a Good Thing Goin'  (Blue Note)
 Stanley Turrentine – Rough 'n' Tumble (Blue Note)

1969
 Rusty Bryant – Rusty Bryant Returns  (Prestige)
 Charles Kynard – The Soul Brotherhood  (Prestige)
 Reuben Wilson – Love Bug  (Blue Note)
 Don Patterson – Brothers-4  (Prestige)
 Don Patterson – Donny Brook  (Prestige)
 Don Patterson – Tune Up!  (Prestige)

1970
 Charles Kynard – Afro-Disiac  (Prestige)
 Fats Theus – Black Out (CTI)
 Houston Person – Person to Person! (Prestige)

1973
 Houston Person - The Real Thing (Eastbound)

References

Discographies of American artists
Jazz discographies